Kafa or Kefa (Kafi noono) is a North Omotic language spoken in Ethiopia at the Keffa Zone. It is part of the Ethiopian Language Area, with SOV word order, ejective consonants, etc.

A collection of proverbs in the language has been published by Mesfin Wodajo.

Manjo 
Within the Kafa culture there is a caste of traditional hunters called the Manja/Manjo 'hunters'. They may once have spoken a different language. However, Leikola has shown that currently they speak Kafa with a number of distinctive words and constructions that they use, reinforcing the distinctions between themselves and the larger Kafa society.

References

Further reading 
 Brockelmann, Carl (1950): Zur Grammatik der Kafa-Sprache. in: Brockelmann, Carl (ed.): Abbessinische Berichte über die Verhandlungen der Sächsischen Akademie der Wissenschaften. Leipzig. pp 40–60.
 Cerulli, Enrico (1951), Studi etiopici. Vol. IV: La lingua Caffina. Roma: Istituto Per L'oriente.
 Fleming, Harold C. (1976), "Kefa (Gonga) Languages", in The Non-Semitic Languages of Ethiopia. Bender, M. L. (ed.)

External links 
 World Atlas of Language Structures information on Kefa

Languages of Ethiopia
North Omotic languages